The 1937–38 Illinois Fighting Illini men's basketball team represented the University of Illinois.

Regular season
The 1937-38 season for second year head coach Doug Mills took a major step backward after finishing in a first place tie a year earlier. Mills' Illinois Fighting Illini men's basketball team dropped to a tie for eighth place in the Big Ten during his sophomore season.  This team featured future major league baseball hall of fame shortstop and manager, Lou Boudreau.  Even though they returned 6 letterman,  the Illini finished the season with a conference record of 4 wins and 8 losses (the worst of Mills' career at Illinois).  The team finished the season with an overall record of 9 wins 9 losses.  Along with team captain Boudreau, the Illini also featured a starting lineup of Lewis Dehner at the center position, Joe Frank and William Hapac at forward and George Wardley, Tom Nisbit and Colin Handlon at guard.

Roster

Source

Schedule

|-
!colspan=12 style="background:#DF4E38; color:white;"| Non-Conference regular season	

|- align="center" bgcolor=""

|-
!colspan=9 style="background:#DF4E38; color:#FFFFFF;"|Big Ten regular season

Bold Italic connotes conference game
												
Source

Awards and honors
 Lou Boudreau
Madison Square Garden 1st team All-American
 Louis Dehner
Converse 3rd team All-American

References

Illinois Fighting Illini
Illinois Fighting Illini men's basketball seasons
1937 in sports in Illinois
1938 in sports in Illinois